Novosti a.d (full legal name: Novinsko-izdavačko društvo Kompanija Novosti a.d. Beograd) is a Serbian media company headquartered in Belgrade Serbia.

History
The company was established in 1953. After decades of operating under a self-management model, the company was transferred to state ownership in the 1990s and then partly privatized in the mid-2000s, though the Government of Serbia still held a substantial stake.

As of 2019, among its assets, the company holds high-circulation daily Večernje novosti as well as various periodicals. The company also has Radio Novosti, an FM station heard throughout greater Belgrade.

In August 2019, "Štamparija Borba" sold its majority share stake in Novosti to Smederevo-based "Media 026" for around 2.5 million euros.

References

External links
 Brza, kratka i jasna krađa at vreme.com 

1953 establishments in Serbia
Companies based in Belgrade
Mass media companies established in 1953
Publishing companies of Serbia